John Bateman may refer to:

 John Bateman, 2nd Viscount Bateman (1721–1802), British politician
 John Bateman (Australian settler) (1789–1855), one of the first Europeans in Fremantle
 John Frederick Bateman (1810–1889), English civil engineer
 John Jones Bateman (1817–1903), English architect
 John Wesley Bateman (1824–1909), Fremantle, Western Australia merchant
 John Bateman (editor) (1839–1910), English compiler of The Great Landowners of Great Britain and Ireland
 John F. Bateman (1914–1998), American football player and coach
 John Bateman (baseball) (1940–1996), Major League Baseball catcher
 John Bateman (rugby league) (born 1993), professional rugby league player
 Lucas North, formerly known as John Bateman, a fictional character from the BBC television series Spooks